The 2018 L&T Mumbai Open was a professional tennis tournament played on outdoor hard courts. It was the 3rd edition of the tournament. It was part of the 2018 WTA 125K series. It took place from 29 October to 3 November 2018 at the Cricket Club of India.

WTA singles main-draw entrants

Seeds

 1 Rankings are as of 22 October 2018.

Other entrants
The following players received wildcards into the singles main draw:
  Rutuja Bhosale
  Sabine Lisicki
  Ng Kwan-yau
  Karman Thandi

The following players received entry from the qualifying draw:
  Hiroko Kuwata
  Tereza Martincová
  Urszula Radwańska
  Pranjala Yadlapalli

The following players received entry into the main draw as a lucky loser:
  Sofia Shapatava

Withdrawals
  Anna Kalinskaya → replaced by  Lu Jiajing
  Vera Zvonareva → replaced by  Deniz Khazaniuk
  Julia Glushko → replaced by  Sofia Shapatava

WTA doubles main-draw entrants

Seeds

 1 Rankings as of 22 October 2018.

Other entrants
The following team received wildcard into the doubles main draw:
  Mahak Jain /  Mihika Yadav

Champions

Singles

  Luksika Kumkhum def.  Irina Khromacheva, 1–6, 6–2, 6–3

Doubles

  Natela Dzalamidze /  Veronika Kudermetova def.  Bibiane Schoofs /  Barbora Štefková, 6–4, 7–6(7–4)

References

External links 
 Official website

2018
Mumbai Open
Mumbai Open